Bandar Bera (or Bera Town / Bandar Kerayong) is a town and district capital of Bera District, Pahang, Malaysia.

Facilities
Bera district mosque
Bera District and Land Office
Majlis Daerah Bera (MDB) main headquarters

Food and beverage
McDonald's
Marrybrown
KFC
Pizza Hut Delivery

Mart
TF Value-Mart
Pasaraya AGRO Kerayong
Pasaraya Borong Sakan
Big 10 Super Store
TMG Mart
Pasaraya Ekonomi Berjaya
Pasaraya Ku
Pasaraya CY
Pasaraya Borong Budget Warehouse
Kedai Serbaneka Eco RM 2
Mukmin Mart

Hotel
Pentagon Inn Hotel
GS Bera Hotel
HOTEL DESA INN

ATM
CIMB Bank
Maybank
Bank Rakyat
Public Bank

References

Bera District
Towns in Pahang